Lotus Creek is a rural locality in the Isaac Region, Queensland, Australia.

History 
Baradha (also known as Barada, Toolginburra, Baradaybahrad, Thararraburra, Toolginburra, Baradha) is an Australian Aboriginal language spoken by the Baradha people. The Baradha language region includes the locality of Lotus Creek and extends along the inland ranges towards Nebo and extends along the Connors River catchment.

References 

Isaac Region
Localities in Queensland